Ivan Radunsky (1872 – 1955) played the part of Bim in the clown duo of Bim Bom. He was the founder of that duo.

He was a Pole by birth.

His group may have influenced the characters "Bim" and "Bom" in Samuel Beckett's More Pricks than Kicks and What Where.

References

1872 births
1955 deaths
Russian clowns
Soviet clowns
Soviet people of Polish descent